Stadio Franco Fanuzzi is an arena in Brindisi, Italy.  It is primarily used for football, and hosts Virtus Francavilla and S.S.D. Città di Brindisi. The stadium holds 6,200 spectators.

References

Football venues in Italy
Buildings and structures in Brindisi
Sport in Brindisi